Paratrichonius caesius is a species of beetle in the family Cerambycidae, the only species in the genus Paratrichonius.

References

Acanthocinini